Myriane is a French feminine given name. Notable people with the name include:

 Myriane Houplain (born 1947), French politician
 Myriane Samson (born 1988), Canadian figure skater

See also
 Marianne
 Myria

French feminine given names